Muhammad Sajid Jokhio is a Pakistani politician who had been a Member of the Provincial Assembly of Sindh, from May 2013 to May 2018.

Early life 
He was born 3 February 1971 in Karachi.

Political career
He was elected to the Provincial Assembly of Sindh as a candidate of Pakistan Peoples Party from Constituency PS-130 KARACHI-XLII in 2013 Pakistani general election.

References

Living people
Sindh MPAs 2013–2018
1971 births
Pakistan People's Party politicians